The Budapest Hurricanes were an American football team based in Budapest, Hungary. The team competed in the Hungarian Football League and the IFAF CEI Cup. The Hurricanes were founded in 2009 and have become a dominant team of Hungary since. Although the team played only three friendly games in 2010, since 2011 they were a full member of the domestic American football competitions. After the Hurricanes were the champions of the HFL and the youth cup as well in 2013, the team had been dissolved in 2014.

Seasons

2010 
Based on the decision of the Hungarian American Football Federation (MAFSZ) the team could not take part in any competition. Consequently, the Hurricanes played three friendly games with foreign teams.

2011 
As a newcomer, the Hurricanes had to compete in the lowest division (Division II) of the Hungarian championships. The team won the Division II undefeated and beat the Újpest Bulldogs 56–14 in the finale. The team simultaneously competed in the Austrian league as well, where they finished the regular season with a 3–1 record. Excluding youth competitions, the Hurricanes became the first Hungarian American football team to win an international championship by defeating the Alpine Hammers 31–13 in the finale.

2012 

As the team was invited to the first season of the Hungarian Football League, it did not participate in the Division I championship. The Hurricanes achieved another historic feature in the regular season by defeating the Budapest Wolves who conceded their first defeat against a Hungarian team since being founded nearly ten years earlier. The Hurricanes, led by head coach Zsolt Kovács, won the regular season encounter 33–27. The team finished the regular season undefeated; however, lost 65–21 in a lopsided game against the Budapest Wolves, who, as a result, won the championship. The Hurricanes could not defend their title in Austria as they lost to the Cineplexx Blue Devils in the regular season and in the finale as well. Both games were decided by less than 9 points. Consequently, the team finished as the runners-up in both competitions in 2012.

2013 
In spring the team competed in the first IFAF CEI Cup. The team did not reach the finale of the competition as they finished with a 2–3 record, which earned them the third place among the four teams. The Hurricanes lost the three games with a combined margin of 10 points. Similarly to 2012, the Hurricanes finished the regular season of the HFL undefeated, which earned them a berth in the 2013 HFL finale. They played in the finale against the Budapest Wolves again. The team rallied and overcame a 10-point difference to win 28–24 and become Hungarian champions.

2014

 *The game was canceled due to weather conditions.

Players

Current roster

Hurricanes Roster at hurricanes.hu

Staff / Coaches

Current Staff / Coaches

References

External links
 Budapest Hurricanes Official Site (Hungarian)
 Budapest Hurricanes Europlayers Site (English)

American football teams in Hungary
Sport in Budapest
Defunct American football teams in Europe
2009 establishments in Hungary
2014 disestablishments in Hungary
American football teams established in 2009
American football teams disestablished in 2014